The Institute for the Advancement of Education in Jaffa (“The Jaffa Institute”) is a non-profit, multi-service social agency located in Jaffa, Tel Aviv, Israel. The Institute was founded by Dr. David Portowicz Col. Ze'ev (Zonik) Shaham z"l in 1982. In 2001, the Institute was awarded the President’s Prize for Most Outstanding Voluntary Organization.

The Jaffa Institute works closely with officials from Israel’s Ministry of Welfare and Social Services to target, provide assistance, and assess the progress of those in need within their service areas.

Through over 40 different program initiatives, The Jaffa Institute provides service and relief to 4,000 citizens annually.

Purpose 
The Jaffa Institute’s mission “is to provide educational, recreational, and social enrichment programs that breaks the cycle of intergenerational poverty in the greater-Jaffa community and support each child's self-esteem so that he/she can evolve into a healthy, educated, and productive adult.”

The Jaffa Institute employs what it describes as “a holistic approach, with activities all developed to empower and support the community as a whole.”

Service areas 
The Jaffa Institute operates in Jaffa, south Tel Aviv, Holon and Bat Yam. The residents of these areas come from diverse religious, ethnic and national backgrounds and include foreign workers, asylum seekers from Africa, and new immigrants from Ethiopia, Eastern Europe and East Asia, in addition to Israeli Jews and Arab citizens of Israel.

50% of the Jaffa Institute's target population currently lives at or below the poverty line and 30% of them regularly receive local welfare services. In addition, both the unemployment rate and the rate of single mothers in Jaffa are double that of Israel's overall census.

In November 2010, a "Report on Poverty" was released by the National Insurance Institute in Israel revealing that in 2009, 1.7 million Israelis were living below the poverty line; including 837,300 children. A resultant 40% of children in Israel are now considered to be living below the poverty line.

History 
As a PhD student at Brandeis University in Boston, David Portowicz decided to focus his social work thesis on poverty in Jaffa. In 1982 Dr. Portowicz founded the Jaffa Institute.

The Jaffa Institute has expanded greatly in the last three decades. Today it provides services to over 4,000 individuals, encompassing both at-risk children and their families.

Originally focusing on education, the Jaffa Institute has now expanded its programming to include services such as after-school programming, crisis intervention, housing for neglected and abused children, workplace training programs for unemployed local women, educational and residential facilities for the rehabilitation and empowerment of teenagers at risk, hot meal programs, and a food distribution center.

Education programs

Morning enrichment 
Noting that the poorly-funded elementary schools in Jaffa generally did not provide a fully comprehensive educational curriculum, The Jaffa Institute established the Morning Enrichment Program in 1986. This program provides lessons before the school day, and supplements the curriculum learned at school, placing socioeconomically disadvantaged students on an even-playing field with children who attend better-funded schools.

After school enrichment (‘Moadoniot’) 

The Institute’s After School Educational Enrichment Program is geared towards 140 underprivileged children from the greater Jaffa area in grades 1-6. The programming is administered at four Jaffa Institute program sites (Neve Ofer, Jaffa Daled, Bat Yam, Bet Metsuba) from September 1 to June 31 everyday between 1 pm and 6 pm. Jaffa Institute buses pick the children up from school, transport them to the program site, and then back home at the end of the day to ensure each student's safety and security.

Neve Ofer (2000) 
Located in the South Tel Aviv neighborhood of Neve Ofer, this Activity Site also shares the building with the Jaffa Institute's Neve Ofer Crisis Intervention House – a 12-bed emergency residential facility for children from Jaffa, Bat Yam and South Tel Aviv who are removed from their homes by the local department of Welfare and Social Services.

Jaffa Daled (2002) 
The Jaffa Institute adapted its after school enrichment program at Jaffa Dalet to support new-immigrant Ethiopian students with comprehensive integration, education, and therapeutic support curriculum. 30 children attend the Jaffa Dalet After-School Activity Center each day, 70% of which are Ethiopian.

Bat Yam (2003) 
According to the last census by Israel's Central Bureau of Statistics, 26% of Bat Yam's families live below the poverty line. Amongst the community of Ethiopian immigrants in Bat Yam the statistics are even more startling with 70% living below the poverty line and 40% of the youth categorized as ‘at-risk’ by the Social Services. Each day 45 children from difficult socio-economic backgrounds attend the Bat Yam After-School Activity Center.

Bet Metsuba (2012) 
Bet Metsuba aims to address the need for after-school programs that are specifically designed for children with various emotional and psychological issues. Each day after school, 36 children with behavioral or learning difficulties arrive at the center in the Hatikva Quarter in East Tel Aviv where they work with counsellors to address their behavioral or learning difficulties through one-on-one emotional therapy programs, group therapy activities encouraging social development, academic plans coordinated with the individual child's schoolwork, parent-child therapy sessions, and more.

Children of Foreign Workers (2014) 
In light of the unique challenges facing the children of foreign workers and asylum seekers, the Jaffa Institute has expanded its After-School Enrichment Program to include four program sites in South Tel Aviv specifically tailored to the needs of this demographic. These sites currently offer educational, recreational, and therapeutic programming to 60 children ages three to ten. By focusing on younger age groups, the Jaffa Institute can intervene in the critical window before the educational gap between these children and their Israeli peers has become insurmountable.

360° scholarship program 
Although academically capable of entering higher education, most families in the South Tel Aviv/Jaffa area simply cannot afford to extend their education. In 1992, The Jaffa Institute initiated the 360° Scholarship Program which provides higher education scholarships to impoverished youth.

English tutoring program 
The “Closing The Gaps” English tutoring program provides children attending underfunded schools in the Jaffa/South Tel Aviv area the opportunity to receive individual academic attention from trained volunteers as well as exposure to basic English language structure. This program runs in both Hebrew and Arabic speaking schools in Jaffa/South Tel Aviv. Development of English language skills on an individual basis “closes the gaps” and puts these students on level academic grounds with their peers attending schools in more affluent neighborhoods in the area.

Building Better Bridges program 
The Building Better Bridges Program facilitates structured interaction and discussion between Jewish and Arab students attending mixed schools in Jaffa and South Tel Aviv. Its scope has since been widened to include children from additional areas, and ethnic, religious and national backgrounds.

Musical Minds program 
Launched in 2001, the Musical Minds program offers arts education for all children. The program is run in close partnership with the Bar Ilan University Yehuda Amir Institute for Social Integration in the Schools and the International Yehudi Menuhin Foundation   promotes cross-cultural dialogue through the arts. Through specifically designed teaching methods and materials, the program helps children from diverse cultural backgrounds to develop cognitive, performance, and communication skills through the study of music and the arts.

Stepping Stone program 
Located in the Kiryat Shalom neighborhood of South Tel Aviv, the Stepping Stone Program for At Risk Teenage Girls assistgirls who engage in destructive behaviors and are at great risk of falling through the gaps in the system by offering an enriching, educational and therapeutic framework.

Youth residences

Bet Shemesh Education Centre (1986) 
The Bet Shemesh Education Centre is a residential and educational campus for at-risk boys. The Centre provides comprehensive Jewish and secular education and consists of modern dormitory blocks, furnished classrooms, a synagogue, dining hall, computer facilities, swimming complex and sports fields, a fully equipped workout room, and a state-of-the-art Science and Technology Center.

Beit Ruth Hostel (2006) 
The Beit Ruth Hostel is an ambitious initiative designed to support the unique needs of at-risk teenage girls between the ages of 14 and 24. The goals of the Beit Ruth Hostel are to provide each teen with a safe warm environment and remove them from their harmful environments; provide tools to overcome their personal problems and self-destructive behaviors; and to enable them to mentally, socially, and academically re-enter mainstream society. These goals are achieved through a coordinated curriculum that combines intensive homeschooling, integrated mental, social, and recreational therapies, community involvement, and daily household responsibilities.

Beit Ruth Educational Village campus (2013) 
The Beit Ruth Educational Village is a joint initiative with the Women's International Zionist Organization (WIZO) of Nir Ha'Emek and will be established on a portion of WIZO's Youth Village near the city of Afula. The Beit Ruth Educational Village will be a safe haven for teenage girls who struggle to develop socially, academically, and emotionally and will eventually serve over 200 disadvantaged girls and young women between the ages of 14 and 24.

Hunger programs 
The Jaffa Institute's “Fight Against Hunger” program targets hunger and malnutrition during after school enrichment activities, in the schools, and the home by providing Israel's most needy with hot meals, bag lunches and food parcels. The program's objective is to provide the resources to temporarily eliminate hunger as a learning impediment, root of depression, and/or inhibitor of pursuing gainful employment.

Hot Lunch program 
The Jaffa Institute operates a free hot meal program to ensure that its students receive at least one hot, nutritious meal a day. The hot meal program now serves 150 children daily.

"A Sandwich for Every Child" 
The daily sandwich program not only provides a nutritious lunch to children who would otherwise go hungry, but also provides part-time jobs to unemployed women who make and distribute 1000 sandwiches daily. This program is executed in close cooperation with the fellow anti-hunger organization, Leket Israel.

The Jaffa Institute operates a food distribution program for Jaffa and Tel Aviv. The program provides 350 impoverished families with two monthly deliveries of nutritious food. Participating families are referred by the City of Tel Aviv's Department of Welfare and community and school social workers. During the holiday times of Pesach and Sukkot, the list triples to include over 1,350 needy individuals and families.

The Institute also distributes food parcels to 120 Holocaust survivors each month and 280 survivors at Passover and Rosh Hashanah. There are close to 30,000 Holocaust survivors in the Jaffa Institute's service area of which 14% suffer from food insecurity.

Food is both purchased by The Jaffa Institute and donated by food companies or collected from charity food donation drives in offices, schools, and youth organizations throughout Tel Aviv. The food is brought to the Jaffa Institute's Food Distribution Center, where it is sorted and packed by volunteers and distributed by private volunteers using their own cars, and by a bus provided by the Dan Bus Company. The Institute also works in partnership with nonprofit organizations Latet  and Leket Israel  to ensure that a maximum number of needy citizens are reached.

Immigrant integration

Early childhood intervention program for the children of foreign workers 
The Early Childhood Intervention Program for the Children of Foreign Workers targets children aged 4–7 from the foreign workers' community in South Tel Aviv, who are not entitled to attend the state-sponsored kindergartens, and provides an educational framework to these children, with a specific focus on Hebrew language skills. This ensures that when these children enroll in elementary school, they have similar language and learning skills as their Israeli-born peers.

Women’s Empowerment programs 
The Jaffa Institute offers several programs specifically for women and mothers in the South Tel Aviv, Jaffa, and Holon areas. These programs are designed to combat discrimination and empower the women of South Tel Aviv, specifically focusing efforts on single mothers, Arab women, and immigrant women from Ethiopia, Sudan, and the former Soviet Union.

Welfare to Wellbeing Program 
Welfare to Wellbeing is an effective workplace training program which provides long-term unemployed women from disadvantaged backgrounds with vocational skills training, psychosocial support and job-placement assistance, thereby enabling them to end their dependence on welfare support and achieve financial self-sufficiency.

The Jewish-Arab Women’s Club 
This group seeks to foster the development of authentic, tolerant, and accepting relationships between Jewish and Arab women living in Jaffa and South Tel Aviv by hosting monthly workshops to discuss issues related to women, specifically, issues relating to women living in Jaffa and South Tel Aviv.

Hebrew language courses for foreign workers 
These Hebrew language courses are specifically designed to develop the abilities of women immigrating from outside of Israel. Providing foreign workers with basic Hebrew skills allows them to be more successful in attaining meaningful employment as well as integrating with confidence into Israeli society.

The Jaffa Institute’s Parent Child Centre 
The Jaffa Institute recognizes the need to invest in the young, single mothers of South Tel Aviv and Jaffa to break the cycle of intergenerational poverty in these areas. The Parent Child Centre offers many programs, ranging from photography courses, parenting classes for Sudanese mothers, programs for young Arab mothers, workshops on fostering nurturing mother-child relationships, drama therapy for women with eating disorders, styling and make-up groups for former drug addicted women, and many others, all designed to empower these marginalized women through togetherness and community.

Awards 
In 2001, the Institute was awarded the President’s Prize for Most Outstanding Voluntary Organization.

The Jaffa Institute’s Educational programming has twice received the Ministry of Education's Award for Outstanding Educational Program, once in 1995 and again in 2004.

References

Organizations based in Tel Aviv
Charities based in Israel
1982 establishments in Israel
Organizations established in 1982
Jaffa
Educational charities
Educational organizations based in Israel